Renewable energy in Greece accounted for 29 percent of its electricity from renewable sources in 2021. By 2030, renewables are expected to exceed 61 percent of Greece's electricity consumption. This is a significant increase from 8% of the country's total energy consumption in 2008. By 2022, Greece occasionally reached 100% renewables for a few hours.

Regulatory conditions
The increase in renewables is in part because of a changing regulatory environment. In August 2016, a new renewable energy law was approved that aims to further stimulate renewable energy investments by introducing feed-in premiums, competitive tenders, and virtual net metering. Under the new law, the compensation for renewable energy producers will consist of what they receive in the electricity market plus a variable feed-in premium. The latter is the difference between a price depending on market variables (e.g., the system’s marginal price) and a set price decided via a competitive tender. Furthermore, from the beginning of 2017, the new scheme to approve new renewable energy capacity is based on competitive tenders, where the Energy Minister is able to call on a tender for specific capacities and technologies.

Wind power 

Wind power was due to expand by 352% by 2010 to meet the European target of 20% coverage of energy needs from renewable sources. Previously, there were 1,028 wind turbines installed throughout Greece and the number was set to reach 2,587 wind turbines before the end of 2010.

According to the Ministry of Environment and Public Works, the system would have a nameplate capacity of 3,372 MW of power from wind alone compared to 746 MW at the end of 2006. Greece chose to invest primarily to wind power by 77%, while the rest of renewable sources altogether comprise the remaining 23% of production with hydroelectric power being second with 11%.

The Centre for Renewable Energy Sources and Saving (CRES) is the Greek national entity for the promotion of renewable energy sources, rational use of energy and energy conservation.

Timeline

Solar power 

The solar energy development in Greece started in 2006 and increased substantially from 2009 because of the high feed-in tariffs introduced and the corresponding regulations for domestic applications of PVs on rooftops. However this mechanism overheated the market creating a big deficit of more than 500 million euros in the Greek "Operator of Electricity Market".

From August 2012 new regulations have been introduced including a temporary tax imposed to all operating PV plants (excluding residential applications), licensing of new PV projects have been put on halt and the feed-in tariffs were drastically reduced.

As of December 2013, the total installed photovoltaic capacity in Greece reached 2,419.2 MWp  of which 987.2 MWp were installed in the period between January–September 2013 despite the financial crisis. Greece ranks 5th worldwide with regard to per capita installed PV capacity. It is expected that PV produced energy will cover up to 7% of the country's electricity demand in 2014.

Geothermal Energy 
Due to Greece's geographical positioning in the world, they are advantageous when its comes to harnessing geothermal energy at high or low temperatures. High temperature geothermal energy is classified by being above 90 degrees Celsius, and low temperature geothermal energy is when temperatures are between 25 and 90 degrees Celsius. High temperature geothermal energy can be located 1-2 kilometers beneath Santorini, Nisyros, and the Aegean Islands of Milos, while low temperature geothermal energy can be located in regions such as Loutra-Samothrakis, Serres, Chalkidiki, Alexandroupolis, Lesvos, Chios, and Thermopyles. Geothermal energy in Greece accounts for only 0.5% of the countries renewable energy, and is expected to increase over coming years.

Biomass and Biofuels 
The amount of biomass that Greece annually produces is estimated to be 2,132,286 tonnes, and this amount comes close to other Mediterranean countries biomass such as Italy and Portugal. Biodiesel is created through such raw materials and around 60% of biodiesel made from Greece originates from oilseeds, 27% comes from used animals fats, frying oils, and vegetable oils, while the last 13% is cotton seeds. Greece's consumption of biofuels is less than 2%, but that percentage is said to increase as years go by because of the large markets and growth potential of biomass and biofuels.

See also

 Energy in Greece
 Solar power in Greece
 Renewable energy by country

References

Further reading